This is a list of urban legends. An urban legend, myth, or tale is a modern genre of folklore. It often consists of fictional stories associated with the macabre, superstitions, ghosts, demons, cryptids, extraterrestrials, creepypasta, and other fear generating narrative elements. Urban legends are often rooted in local history and popular culture.

0–9 
 The 27 Club is an urban legend that popular musicians and other celebrated artists die at age 27 with statistically anomalous frequency, notably Brian Jones, Jimi Hendrix, Janis Joplin, Jim Morrison, Kurt Cobain, and Amy Winehouse. The claim of a "statistical spike" for the death of musicians at that age has been repeatedly disproven by studies.
 The 999 phone charging myth is an urban legend which claims that calling an emergency telephone number, then promptly hanging up, charges mobile phone batteries.
 The 1962 Halloween massacre was an urban legend about a photo of a Halloween costume party in 1962, in which seven people were purportedly killed.
 The 2016 clown sightings were an urban legend that rose in popularity during 2016 about an individual or group dressed up as clowns who stalk, harass, or otherwise scare random people.

A 
 Aerial water bomber picking up scuba diver is an urban legend about a water bomber, or a helicopter with a dangling water bucket, scooping up a scuba diver and dumping them on a wildfire site. This legend was used as a plot device in the films Magnolia and Barney's Version. The urban legend debunking site Snopes.com reports there are no proven cases of this happening in reality. The Discovery Channel show MythBusters also disproved the myth.  
 Alexandria's Genesis is a purported genetic mutation that gives its carrier purple eyes, shimmering pale skin, a lack of body hair, and a lack of menstruation while still remaining fertile. The legend originated in a Daria fanfiction written in 1998, and since the 2000s has seen circulation on internet forums and social media.
 The Ankle slicing car thief (or the man under the car) is an urban legend that tells of a driver that keeps hearing noises under their car when they are driving. When they step out of the car to investigate, their ankles get sliced open with a knife. While they are rolling around on the ground in pain, a car thief emerges from underneath the car and steals it.
 Annabelle is an allegedly haunted Raggedy Ann doll, housed in the (now closed) occult museum of the paranormal investigators Ed and Lorraine Warren. Annabelle was moved there after supposed hauntings in 1970.
 Area 51 is another name for a portion of Edwards Air Force Base that UFO enthusiasts have theorized contains evidence of visitors from outer space.

B 
 Baby Train is an urban legend which claims that a small town had an unusually high birth rate because a train would pass through the town at 5:00 am and blow its whistle, waking up all the residents. Since it was too late to go back to sleep and too early to get up, couples would have sex. This resulted in the mini baby-boom.
 The Backrooms is an urban legend originating from a 2019 4chan thread that claimed an "out of bounds" area of reality existed, resembling liminal spaces, which could be accessed accidentally and could not be escaped from. The legend soon developed to include real or implied creatures that terrorize and hunt people trapped in the Backrooms.
 The babysitter and the man upstairs (also known as the babysitter or the sitter) is an urban legend dating back to the 1960s about a teenage girl babysitting children who receives telephone calls from a stalker who continually asks her to "check the children".
 The Bandage Man is an urban legend about a logger who died in a grisly sawmill accident that attacks cars and terrorizes teenagers.
 The Beast of Bladenboro (colloquially known as the Vampire Beast of Bladenboro or Vampire Cat) was a creature purportedly responsible for a string of deaths amongst Bladenboro, North Carolina animals in the winter of 1953–54.
 The Beast of Bodmin Moor is a folklore legend that describes a phantom cat purported to live in Cornwall, England, United Kingdom. Bodmin Moor became a centre of purported sightings after 1978, with occasional reports of mutilated slain livestock; the alleged panther/leopard-like black cats of the same region came to be popularly known as the Beast of Bodmin Moor.
 The Beast of Exmoor (also known as the Exmoor Beast) is a folklore legend that describes a phantom cat said to roam the fields of Exmoor in Devon and Somerset in the United Kingdom.
 The Bell Witch is a folklore legend from 1817 to 1821, his family and the local area came under attack by a mostly invisible entity that was able to speak, affect the physical environment, and shapeshift, and was located in Robertson County, Tennessee.
 Ben Drowned (also known as BEN Drowned or Haunted Majora's Mask) is a fictitious psychological horror series that originated as an alternate reality game created by American author Alex Hall in 2010. It follows college sophomore Jadusable, who, after acquiring a haunted Nintendo 64 video game cartridge of The Legend of Zelda: Majora's Mask, is plagued over the course of a single week by the presence of a seemingly omniscient being called BEN.
 Jarrell Bettis (also known as the Dog Boy, sometimes known as Gerald) was an urban legend that describes a sinister young boy in Quitman, Arkansas.
 Bigfoot (also commonly referred to as Sasquatch) is a folklore legend that describes an ape-like creature that is purported to inhabit the forests of North America.
 Black Aggie is a folklore legend that describes a statue formerly placed on the grave of General Felix Agnus in Druid Ridge Cemetery in Pikesville, Maryland.
 The Black Angel is a folklore legend that describes a statue in Iowa City that is said to be cursed, based on the death of Teresa Feldevert.
 Black Annis (also known as Black Agnes or Black Anna) is a folklore legend that describes a blue-faced hag or witch with iron claws and a taste for human flesh (especially children).
 The Black Lady of Bradley Woods is a folklore legend that describes a ghost which reportedly haunts the woods near the village of Bradley, Lincolnshire, England.
 Black Volga refers to a black Volga limousine that was allegedly used to abduct people in Eastern Europe, especially children.
 Black-eyed children (or black-eyed kids) are an urban legend of supposed paranormal creatures that resemble children between the ages of 6 and 16, with pale skin and black eyes, who are reportedly seen hitchhiking or panhandling, or are encountered on doorsteps of residential homes. Tales of black-eyed children have appeared in pop culture since the late 1990s.
 Bloody Mary is a folklore legend consisting of a ghost or spirit conjured to reveal the future. She is said to appear in a mirror when her name is called multiple times. The Bloody Mary apparition may be benign or malevolent, depending on historic variations of the legend. The Bloody Mary appearances are mostly "witnessed" in group participation games.
 The Blue star tattoo legend refers to a modern legend that LSD tabs are being distributed as lick-and-stick temporary tattoos to children.
 Boo hags are an African-American folklore legend of the Gullah culture tells us about evil souls who stay behind after death and become skinless, vampire-like witches who take other people's skin for a "ride".
 The Brown Lady of Raynham Hall is a folklore legend that describes a ghost that reportedly haunts Raynham Hall in Norfolk, England.
 Mercy Brown is a folklore legend based on the exhumation of a young woman from Exeter, Rhode Island, who died from tuberculosis.
 The Buckley family story is an urban legend about an old photo of two children who murdered their mother one Halloween.
 Bunny Man is an urban legend that probably originated from two incidents in Fairfax County, Virginia, in 1970, but has been spread throughout the Washington, D.C. area. There are many variations to the legend, but most involve a man or ghost wearing a rabbit costume ("bunny suit") who attacks people with an axe.

C 
 Cadborosaurus (nicknamed Caddy) is a folklore legend that describes an alleged sea monster from British Columbian coast of Cadboro Bay.
  (also known as Jessica Smith) is a chain letter that describes the story of a girl who was pushed down a sewer drain.
 Castilian lisp is an urban legend claiming that the prevalence of the sound  in European Spanish can be traced back to a Spanish king who spoke with a lisp, and whose pronunciation spread by prestige borrowing to the rest of the population. This myth has been discredited by scholars for lack of evidence.
 The Catman of Greenock is the urban legend since the 1970s of a man in Greenock, Scotland who eats rats with his hands. He earned the name 'Catman', due to rumours that he lived with and cared for a group of wild cats.
 The Celebrity Death Rule of Threes is a superstition that movie stars, celebrities, and politicians die in groups of three.
 The Chaneques are creatures of Aztec mythology, entities associated with the underworld whose main activity is to care for mountains and wild animals. It presents different aspects, of which the one of small men (or women) stands out.
 The Choking Doberman is an urban legend that originated in the United States. The story involves a protective pet found by its owner gagging on human fingers lodged in its throat. As the story unfolds, the dog's owner discovers an intruder whose hand is bleeding from the dog bite.
 The Chonchon is a folklore legend that describes a mythical bird from Mapuche religion also present in Chilean and southern Argentine folk myth.
 The chupacabra (from chupar "to suck" and cabra "goat", literally "goat sucker") is a legendary cryptid rumored to inhabit parts of the Americas, with the first sightings reported in Puerto Rico. The name comes from the animal's reported habit of attacking and drinking the blood of livestock, especially goats.
 Clara Crane (also known as the Candy Lady) is an urban legend thought to be the inspiration behind an actual missing children case in Terrell, Texas.
 The clown doll (also known as the clown statue) is an urban legend based somewhat on "the babysitter and the man upstairs" legend.
 Eunice Cole (better known as Goody Cole) was blamed for numerous local tragedies and accused of witchcraft twice in Brentwood, New Hampshire in 1656 and again in 1673.
 The corpse light is an urban legend that describes a symbol of false comfort, a phantom light located in Cape Henlopen State Park.
 Cow tipping is the purported activity of sneaking up on any unsuspecting or sleeping upright cow and pushing it over for entertainment.
 Creepypastas are horror-related legends or images that have been copy-pasted around the Internet. These internet entries are often brief, user-generated, paranormal stories intended to scare readers. They include gruesome tales of murder, suicide, and otherworldly occurrences. People often (falsely) believe them to be true.
 Cropsey is a folklore legend that describes a boogeyman-like figure, before segueing into the story of Andre Rand, a convicted child kidnapper from Staten Island through the 1970s–80s.
 The Crying Boy is a mass-produced print of an allegedly cursed painting by Italian painter Giovanni Bragolin. This was the pen-name of the painter Bruno Amadio. It was widely distributed from the 1950s onwards.
 The Cucuy is a folklore legend that describes a mythical ghost-monster, malevolent and equivalent to the bogeyman of Latin American countries.
 The curse of the Bambino was a superstition evolving from the failure of the Boston Red Sox baseball team to win the World Series in the 86-year period from 1918 to 2004. While some fans took the curse seriously, most used the expression in a tongue-in-cheek manner.
 The curse of Escalante Petrified Forest is an urban legend that claims those who take petrified wood from Escalante Petrified Forest State Park in Utah risk bad luck, job loss, sickness, and accidents.
 The cursed memorial of Jonathan Buck is a woman's stocking-clad foot, or maybe a boot, located in Bucksport Cemetery, Maine.

D 
 The Dark Watchers (also known by early Spanish settlers as Los Vigilantes Oscuros) is a folklore legend from Santa Lucia Range, California.
 The Dead children's playground is located in Maple Hill Park, Alabama. This urban legend is about how many children lost their lives in Huntsville, during the Spanish Flu Pandemic of 1918. Most of them were buried in Maple Hill Cemetery, alongside a playground.
 The Death Number 999-9999 is an urban legend claiming that if someone calls 999-9999 after midnight, they will be able to request anything they wish, but at the cost of their death. The legend was adapted into a horror movie, 999-9999, in 2002.
 The Death ship of the Platte River (or the ghost ship of the Platte River) is an urban legend about an old sailing ship that appears grey and unnatural, crewed by phantom sailors, sighted between Alcova and Torrington, Wyoming since the mid-1800s.
 The Death of James Dean in a car accident spawned many urban legends related to his car. The most common one (often described as a "curse") states that any individual who took a part from Dean's car after the accident later died in an accident of their own. Other stories include the wreck itself being involved in accidents causing loss of life or heavy destruction of property and its unexplained disappearance in 1960.
 The Devil's chair (or haunted chair) is a folklore legend that describes a class of funerary or memorial sculpture common in the United States during the 19th century.
 The Devil's Footprints (or the Devon Devil) was a phenomenon that occurred during February 1855 around the Exe Estuary in East and South Devon, England.
 The Devil's Tramping Ground is a camping spot located in a forest near the Harper's Crossroads area in Bear Creek, North Carolina.
 The Dover Demon is a folklore legend that describes a creature reportedly sighted in the town of Dover, Massachusetts on April 21 and April 22, 1977.
 Dudleytown is an abandoned settlement in Connecticut in the United States, best known today as a ghost town. Due to vandalism and trespassers, the site is not open to the public.
 The Dybbuk box (or the Dibbuk box) is a folklore legend that describes a wine cabinet claimed to be haunted by a dybbuk, a concept from Jewish mythology.

E 

 The Enfield poltergeist was a claim of supernatural activity at 284 Green Street, a council house in Brimsdown, Enfield, London, England, between 1977 and 1979 involving two sisters, aged 11 and 13.
The Elevator Game is a ritual that purportedly sends the participant to an alternate world if done correctly, and involves a mysterious woman that may enter the elevator with them. The legend is said to date back to 2008 on the Japanese website 2channel.

F 
Fair Charlotte is a legend of how a foolish New England girl froze to death during a sleigh ride to a New Years ball because she was too vain to put warm clothing over her silk dress. The source was a 1838 morality tale of a vain girl who froze to death in London.
 The Felixstowe fire demon was an extraterrestrial sighting that took place in the English town of Felixstowe, England, on the evening of September 20, 1965.
 The Flatwoods monster (also known as the Braxton County monster, phantom of Flatwoods, or "Braxxy") is a folklore legend that describes an entity reported to have been sighted in the town of Flatwoods in Braxton County, West Virginia, United States, on September 12, 1952, after a bright object crossed the night sky.
 The Fouke Monster (also known as the Boggy Creek Monster and the Swamp Stalker) is a folklore legend that describes an ape-like creature, similar to descriptions of Bigfoot, that was allegedly sighted in the rural town of Fouke, Arkansas during the early 1970s.
 The Frozen Hill people (or the deep frozen old folks) was a folklore legend that describes an extremely poor family of hill farmers isolated in Bridgewater Corners, Vermont since 21 December 1887.
 The Fresno Nightcrawlers are cryptids first spotted in Fresno, California on CCTV footage. They appear to be white long-legged creatures, compared to "walking pairs of pants".

G 
 The gateway to Hell is an urban legend and located in the Stull Cemetery, Kansas, the stairs in an old demolished church open to the other side on Halloween and the spring equinox.
 The ghost boy of Clinton Road is an urban legend that describes a dead young boy who hangs out under a bridge and returns coins to you after you throw them in the water.
 The Ghost of Kyiv is an urban legend of a Ukrainian fighter ace defending Kyiv during the 2022 Russian invasion of Ukraine.
 Goatman is a folklore legend that describes a creature resembling a goat-human hybrid often credited with canine deaths and purported to take refuge in the woods of Beltsville, Maryland.
 Golem is a folklore legend that describes a large humanoid creature made from rock or clay who is clumsy or slow and in modern Hebrew the word Golem literally means "cocoon", but can also mean "fool", "silly", or even "stupid".
 The Green children of Woolpit were two children of unusual skin colour who reportedly appeared in the village of Woolpit in Suffolk, England, some time in the 12th century, perhaps during the reign of King Stephen.
 The Green Clawed Beast is a green clawed humanoid beast lurking in the Ohio River to attack unsuspecting women in the city of Evansville, Indiana since August 14, 1955.

H 
 Hanako-san is a Japanese urban legend of the spirit of a young girl who haunts school bathrooms, and can be described as a yōkai or a yūrei. To summon her, individuals must enter a girls' bathroom (usually on the third floor of a school), knock three times on the third stall, and ask if Hanako-san is present.
 The Hands Resist Him is a painting that was created by artist Bill Stoneham in 1972. It depicts a young boy and a female doll standing in front of a glass paneled door, against which many hands are pressed.
 The Hanging Man of Halloween was a 42-year-old woman who hanged herself in a tree along a busy road in Frederica, Delaware.
 The Hanging Munchkin is a small shadowed figure seen during the film The Wizard of Oz, purportedly an actor (portraying a Munchkin) caught in the act of committing suicide. Snopes.com finds no evidence of any such death, and instead identifies the figure as one of several large birds allowed to roam the set. 
 Headless Rider is a Japanese urban legend about a motorcycle rider whose head was cut off by piano wire when he crashed into it at high speed.
 Haunchyville is an urban legend that describes a mythical village of dwarves in Waukesha County, Wisconsin, United States. It is rumored to be located near Mystic Drive in Muskego.
 Herobrine is an creepypasta and urban legend in the videogame "Minecraft". He has bright white eyes, brown hair and wears a blue shirt and dark-blue trousers.
 The Haunted Pillar (or the Cursed Pillar) was a landmark left standing near the remains of a farmer's market that once stood at 5th and Broad Streets in downtown Augusta, Georgia.
 The Highgate Vampire was a folklore legend that describes a media sensation surrounding reports of supposed supernatural activity at Highgate Cemetery in London in the 1970s.
 Hippo Eats Dwarf. An internet-spread urban legend about a circus performer being accidentally swallowed by a hippopotamus.
 HMS Friday is an urban myth concerning a disastrous attempt by the Royal Navy to dispel the superstition against sailing on a Friday.
 The hodag (or the Rhinelander hodag) was a folklore legend that describes a fearsome critter resembling a large bull-horned carnivore with a row of thick curved spines down its back. The hodag was said to be born from the ashes of cremated oxen, as the incarnation of the accumulation of abuse the animals had suffered at the hands of their masters in the city of Rhinelander, Wisconsin.
 Homey the Clown was an urban legend (specifically Chicago) surrounding a killer clown, predating the "Creepy Clown Craze" by several years, originating in Chicago, Illinois in 1991.
 The Honey Island Swamp monster is a folklore legend that describes a sasquatch-like creature that can allegedly be found living in the Honey Island Swamp of Louisiana.
 The Hook, also called Hookman. Originating in post-war America, it recounts a story of a murderer with a hook prosthesis in place of a hand.
 The Hopkinsville goblins (or the Kentucky goblins) was a supposed extraterrestrial visit by small, goblin-like, green "hairless children" with three toes in Hopkinsville, Kentucky.
 The hundredth monkey effect is a hypothetical phenomenon in which a new behavior or idea is spread rapidly by unexplained means from one group to all related groups once a critical number of members of one group exhibit the new behavior or acknowledge the new idea.

I 
 The Ilkley Moor UFO incident was a supposed extraterrestrial sighting by a retired police officer in the moorland of West Yorkshire, England since December 1, 1987.
 In the Air Tonight is a song by Phil Collins that is allegedly about a drowning incident in which someone who was close enough to save the victim did not help them, while Collins, who was too far away to help, looked on. Increasingly embellished variations on the legend emerged over time, with the stories often culminating in Collins singling out the guilty party while singing the song at a concert.

J 
 JATO Rocket Car started as a Darwin Award winner where a driver strapped a pair of Jet Assisted Take Off (JATO) units to the rear of his car and ended up smashing into the side of a hill in Arizona. No police agency in Arizona took a report of this type of accident. The Arizona Department of Public Safety even issued a press release on their website debunking the report. This myth was also tested on the Discovery Channel show MythBusters multiple times.
 Jeff the Killer
 The Jersey Devil (also known as the Leeds Devil) is a folklore legend that describes a legendary creature said to inhabit the Pine Barrens of South Jersey. The creature is often described as a flying biped with hooves, but there are many variations. The common description is that of a bipedal kangaroo-like or wyvern-like creature with a horse- or goat-like head, leathery bat-like wings, horns, small arms with clawed hands, legs with cloven hooves, and a forked tail. It has been reported to move quickly and is often described as emitting a high-pitched "blood-curdling scream".
 Robert Johnson was a Mississippi blues singer and songwriter who, according to legend, sold his soul to Satan "at the crossroads" in exchange for his remarkable talent on the guitar.

K 
 The Killer in the Backseat (also known as  High Beams) is a common car-crime urban legend well known mostly in the United States and the United Kingdom. The legend involves a woman who is driving and being followed by a strange car or truck. The mysterious pursuer flashes his high beams, tailgates her, and sometimes even rams her vehicle. When she finally makes it home, she realizes that the driver was trying to warn her that there was a man (a murderer, rapist, or escaped mental patient) hiding in her back seat. Each time the man sat up to attack her, the driver behind had used his high beams to scare the killer, after which he ducked down.
 Killswitch is a fictional video game. According to the legend, this game can only be played once – If your character dies or you manage to complete the game, the game will delete itself and will leave no trace. It has also been cited as the primary inspiration behind the creepypasta Ben Drowned.
 Krampus (also known as the Christmas Devil and the Christmas Demon) is a folklore legend that describes a horned anthropomorphic beast who during the Christmas season scares children who have misbehaved, assisting Nicholas.
 Kuchisake-onna (口裂け女, "Slit-Mouthed Woman") is a Japanese urban legend about the malevolent spirit, or onryō, of a mutilated woman. She is said to partially cover her face with a mask or object and reportedly carries a sharp tool of some kind, such as a knife or a large pair of scissors.
 Kushtaka (or Kooshdakhaa) is a Native American legend from the Tlingit culture that describes a cross between an otter and a man. The Kushtaka make noises that mimic children and wives to lure fishermen, though they are sometimes helpful tricksters.

L 
 The Licked Hand (also known as Doggy Lick or Humans Can Lick Too) is an urban legend popular among teenagers. The story describes a killer who secretly spends the night under a girl's bed, licking her hand when offered, which she takes to be her dog.
 Lighthouse and naval vessel, describes a humorous encounter between a large naval ship and what at first appears to be another vessel, with which the ship is on a collision course, which is later revealed to be a lighthouse.
 The Lincoln Imp is a folklore legend that tells of a creature sent to England’s Lincoln Cathedral by Satan, only to be turned into stone by an angel.
 Lincoln–Kennedy coincidences urban legend is a list of coincidences that appeared in the mainstream American press in 1964, a year after the assassination of John F. Kennedy.
 La Llorona is a folklore legend that describes a vengeful ghost who roams waterfront areas mourning her children whom she drowned before drowning herself in regret.
 Love Rollercoaster Scream is an urban legend that during an instrumental portion of the song, the scream is a sound effect borrowed from an emergency call.
 The Loveland frog (also known as the Loveland frogman or Loveland Lizard) is a folklore legend that describes a legendary humanoid frog described as standing roughly 4 feet (1.2 m) tall, allegedly spotted in Loveland, Ohio.

M 
 The MacKenzie poltergeist is the supposed restless spirit of George Mackenzie, an infamous figure in Scottish history who engaged in merciless oppression of religious minorities, to the extent a portion of the graveyard of Greyfriars Kirkyard he haunts is dedicated (somewhat ironically) to his countless victims.
 The Mad Gasser of Mattoon (also known as the Anesthetic Prowler, the Phantom Anesthetist, or simply the Mad Gasser) was the name given to the person or people believed to be responsible for a series of apparent gas attacks that occurred in Mattoon, Illinois, during the mid-1940s.
 Madam Koi Koi (Lady Koi Koi, Miss Koi Koi, also known in Ghana as Madam High Heel or Madam Moke, Tanzania as Miss Konkoko, South Africa as Pinky Pinky) is an African urban legend that describes a ghost who haunts dormitories, hallways and toilets in boarding schools at night, while in day schools she haunts toilets and students who come to school too early or leave school late. She is often depicted wearing a pair of red heels or wearing a single heel.
 Mae Nak Phra Khanong is an urban legend about the ghost of a pregnant woman whose spirit haunts the people of Phra Khanong, Bangkok during the beginning of Rattanakosin era (around Rama III or Rama IV's reigns), her story has been adapted into stage plays, TV dramas, and movies many times.
 La Mala Hora (also known as la Malora or la Malogra) is a folklore legend from New Mexico that describes an evil spirit that haunts the crossroads at night, hunting those who travel the roads alone.
 The manananggal is a folklore legend that describes an old mythical creature in the Philippines that separates from their lower part of body and their fangs and wings give it a vampire-like appearance.
 Melody is dead is an urban legend claiming that Spanish singer Melody (not Melodía, which is the singer's real name) died in an airplane accident.
 Melon heads are beings generally described as small humanoids with bulbous heads who occasionally emerge from hiding places to attack people.
 Men in black is an urban legend and conspiracy theory claiming that men dressed in black suits who claim to be government agents who harass or threaten UFO witnesses or victims of alleged alien abductions to keep them quiet about what they have seen.
 Mercritis is an urban legend that was an infectious disease that, among other things, transformed women into homicidal maniacs.
 The Miniwashitu (also known as the Water Monster of the Missouri River) is an aquatic bison-like creature found swimming in the Missouri River in central North Dakota.
 The Momo Challenge was a hoax and an Internet urban legend that was rumored to spread through social media and other outlets. It was reported that children and adolescents were being enticed by a user named Momo to perform a series of dangerous tasks including violent attacks, self-harm and suicide.
 Momo the Monster (also known as the Missouri Monster) is a folklore legend that describes a purported ape-like creature, similar to descriptions of Bigfoot, that was allegedly sighted by numerous people in rural Louisiana, Missouri in 1972. 
 The Monkey-man of Delhi was a mysterious creature or criminal that was reported attacking locals near New Delhi in mid-2001. Most sources consider the monster an urban legend, and creation brought on from exaggerated media hysteria, often compared to the Spring-heeled Jack epidemic during Victorian times.
 Edward Mordake (sometimes spelled Mordrake) is the apocryphal subject of an urban legend who was, according to the legend, born in the 19th century as the heir to an English peerage with a face at the back of his head.
 The Mothman is a folklore legend that describes a humanoid creature reportedly seen in the Point Pleasant area from November 15, 1966, to December 15, 1967.
 The Mowing-Devil of Hertfordshire is the title of an English woodcut pamphlet published in 1678. The pamphlet tells of a farmer in Hertfordshire who, refusing to pay the price demanded by a labourer to mow his field, swore he would rather the Devil mowed it instead.
 La Muelona (also known as Colmillona; "big fang woman") is a folklore legend from Muisca mythology, present in the populations located in the Andean region (Huila and Tolima) of Colombia.
 The mutated Fukushima giant hornets (or the radioactive hornets) is a recent urban legend that describes a giant mutant killer hornets created by exposure to radiation from the Fukushima Daiichi nuclear disaster have killed several people in Nebraska.

N 
 The Nai Khanomtom story is a contemporary legend suggesting that a Thai Muaythai fighter had beaten 9 Burmese Lethwei fighters in a row, with no rest period, in 1767. Ultimately, he wins his freedom from King Mangra in Burma.
 The Nain Rouge is a folklore legend that describes a legendary creature of the Detroit, Michigan area whose appearance is said to presage misfortune.
 The Nale Ba are malevolent spirits or witches said to take away children, primarily in Karnataka, India. By writing "naale baa" (which means "come tomorrow") on doors or walls prevents the spirit from entering the houses.
 The nightmarchers (or the night marchers) are the deadly ghosts of ancient Hawaiian warriors. The nightmarchers are the vanguard for a sacred King, Chief or Chiefess.
 The Niles Canyon ghost is an urban legend within the vanishing hitchhiker archetype, about the ghost of a girl who had died in a car accident.

O 
 The Owlman (sometimes referred to as the Cornish Owlman or the Owlman of Mawnan) is a folklore legend that describes an owl-like creature said to have been seen in 1976 in the village of Mawnan, Cornwall, United Kingdom.
 Ong's Hat  is a folklore legend that describes a group of mystics and Princeton scientists the developed interdimensional travel technology in the abandoned town of Ong's Hat, in the New Jersey Pine Barrens.

P 
 Paul is dead is an urban legend suggesting that Paul McCartney of the English rock band The Beatles died in 1966 and was secretly replaced by a body double. Similar urban legends have also formed around Avril Lavigne and Melania Trump.
 The Parson and Clerk is a tale focusing on a clergyman and the devil set near a natural arch located near the towns of Teignmouth and Dawlish, Devon, England. Along the coast towards Dawlish where the railway runs through the Parson's tunnel can be seen the twin stacks of the Parson and Clerk.
 Julia Petta (also known as the Italian Bride) was a woman who died in childbirth.  Her mother dreamed she was still alive and had her body exhumed six years after her death.  When the casket was opened, her body, with the exception of the arm holding her stillborn child and the child, was still intact.
 The phantom clowns were first sighted in 1981 by described as being dressed as clowns, with white faces, red noses, and colorful clothing in the town of Brookline, Massachusetts.
 The phantom hitchhiker of Black Horse Lake is an urban legend that describes a Native American man with long black hair wearing an outdated, baggy jacket and jeans collides with cars, suddenly appearing on their windshield, only for him to vanish without a dent.
 Phantom P-40 Airplane/pilot in its original form the pilot is a survivor of the 1941 Battle in the Philippines who wages a one-man war against the Japanese until his heavily-damaged aircraft crashes in China; a modern variation is that he crashes after flying from the Philippines to Pearl Harbor.
 Phi Yai Wan is an urban legend about the ghost of a pregnant woman similar to renowned Mae Nak Phra Khanong, but her story takes place in Taling Chan in the 1970s.
 Pishtaco is a folklore legend that describes a mythological boogeyman in the Andes region of South America, particularly in Peru and Bolivia.
 Poisoned candy myths are urban legends about malevolent strangers hiding poisons or sharp objects such as razor blades, needles, or broken glass in candy and distributing the candy in order to harm random children, especially during Halloween trick-or-treating.
 Polybius is a fictitious arcade game, the subject of an urban legend that emerged in early 2000. It has served as inspiration for several free and commercial games by the same name. Similar urban legends about arcade games with harmful side effects (nightmares, suicidal thoughts, etc.), albeit without using the name "Polybius," had circulated since the 1980s. These similar urban legends, from before the name was standardized, were referred to by gaming commentator Ahoy as "protomyths."
 El Pombéro (also known as Pomberito) is a folklore legend that describes a mythical humanoid creature of small stature in Guaraní mythology.
 Project MKUltra was a real Central Intelligence Agency government-funded program in the early 1950s to the early 1970s responsible for many dangerous, irresponsible, and inhumane experiments on American citizens. Since its reveal in 1977, it has spawned numerous myths and legends about it.
 Pukwudgies is a folklore legend that describes a human-like creature found in Hockomock Swamp, Massachusetts, sometimes said to be 2-to-3-foot-tall (61 to 91 cm).

R 
 The Ratman of Southend is an English urban legend originating in Southend-on-Sea, Essex. The story of the Ratman tells of an old homeless man, seeking shelter from the cold in an underpass, was set upon by a group of youths and beaten to near-death, cold and blood loss doing the rest. As he died, the numerous vermin who inhabit the area gathered, and were found to have devoured his face. After this, a ghostly figure was spotted in the underpass, with people hearing rat-like squealing, and scraping, as if large claws were moving across the walls.
 The Red Lady of Huntingdon College is a folklore legend that describes a ghost said to haunt the former Pratt Hall dormitory at Huntingdon College in Montgomery, Alabama.
 The Red Room Curse (赤い部屋) is a Japanese early Internet urban legend about a supposed red pop-up ad which announces a forthcoming death of the person seeing it.
 Resurrection Mary is a "vanishing hitchhiker"-type ghost story associated with Resurrection Cemetery in Justice, Illinois just outside of Chicago.  
 The Richmond Vampire (or Hollywood Vampire) is a purported vampiric entity associated with Church Hill Tunnel and Hollywood cemetery in Richmond, Virginia. Possibly associated with the 1925 death of Benjamin Mosby, a railway worker killed during restoration work in the tunnel.
 Riverdale Road, a winding 11-mile path between Thornton, Colorado and Brighton, is associated with several supposed hauntings and paranormal phenomena.
 Robert the Doll is an allegedly haunted doll exhibited at the East Martello Museum. Robert was once owned by Key West, Florida, painter and author Robert Eugene Otto.
 Raymond Robinson (also known as the Green Man and Charlie No-Face) was a severely disfigured man whose years of nighttime walks made him into a figure of urban legend in Pittsburgh, Pennsylvania.
 The Roswell incident is urban legend that describes a UFO and its extraterrestrial crew crash-landed in the New Mexico desert near Roswell on July 2, 1947.
 The rougarou (alternatively spelled as roux-ga-roux, rugaroo, or rugaru) is a folklore legend that describes a legendary creature in French communities linked to traditional concepts of the werewolf in Acadiana, Louisiana.
 The Russian Sleep Experiment is a creepypasta which tells the tale of five test subjects being exposed to an experimental sleep-inhibiting stimulant in a Soviet-era scientific experiment, which has become the basis of an urban legend.

S 
 La Santa Compaña is a folklore legend that describes a deep-rooted mythical belief in rural northwest of Iberia: Galicia, Asturias (Spain) and Northern Portugal.
 La Sayona is a folklore legend from Venezuela, represented by the vengeful spirit of a woman that shows up only to men that have love affairs out of their marriages.
 The Seven Gates of Hell is a modern urban legend regarding locations in York County, Pennsylvania. Two versions of the legend exist, one involving a burnt insane asylum and the other an eccentric doctor. Both agree that there are seven gates in a wooded area of Hellam Township, Pennsylvania, and that anyone who passes through all seven goes straight to Hell.
 Sewer alligators is an urban legend based upon reports of alligator sightings in rather unorthodox locations, in particular New York City.
 The Shaman's Portal is an urban legend and located in Beaver Dunes Park, Oklahoma due to the strange disappearances that have occurred over the years.
 Shotgun Man is an urban legend of organized crime: as an assassin and spree killer in Chicago, Illinois in the 1910s, to whom murders by Black Hand extortionists were attributed. Most notably, Shotgun Man killed 15 Italian immigrants from January 1, 1910 to March 26, 1911 at "Death Corner," the intersection of Oak Street and Milton Avenue (now Cleveland Avenue) in what was then Chicago's Little Sicily. In March 1911, he reportedly murdered four people within 72 hours. However a check of the Northwestern University website on "Homicide in Chicago" shows shotgun killings in Chicago – but none in Jan–March 1911 – and only one killing at Oak and Milton Streets between 1900 and 1920 (Reference only).
 Showmen's Rest is a creepy mass grave where phantom elephants buried in Woodlawn Cemetery are said to trumpet late at night.
 El Silbón (also known as the Whistler) is a folklore legend that describes a spirit found in Venezuelan legends, He was a former farmer who become a damned soul after he killed his father.
 Skeleton in a tree is an urban legend alleging that years after the defeat of St. Clair in 1791 at Fort Recovery, Mercer County, Ohio, the skeleton of a Captain Roger Vanderberg was found in Miami County, Ohio inside a tree, along with a diary. However, no one of this name was a casualty of the 1791 battle; the story originated in 1864 from a Scottish novel.
 The Skin-walkers (or the Skinwalkers) is a Native American legend from the Navajo culture that describes medicine men who have become evil and are able to shapeshift into animals and other people.
 Skinned Tom is an urban legend from Walland, Tennessee about a young man named Tom and a bogeyman-type figure who came to a grisly end.
 The Skunk ape (also known as the swamp ape and Florida Bigfoot) is a folklore legend that describes an ape-like creature that is purported to inhabit the forests and swamps of some southeastern United States, most notably in Florida where sightings have been reported from as far north as the Georgian border, south to the Florida Keys.
 Slaughterhouse Canyon (or Luana's Canyon) is a valley in Arizona and has an elevation of 3,428 feet; the myth takes place during the Gold Rush.
 Slender Man (also known as Slender man or Slenderman) is a fictional character that originated as an Internet meme created by Something Awful forums user Victor Surge in 2009. It is depicted as resembling a thin, unnaturally tall man with a blank and usually featureless face and wearing a black suit. The Slender Man is commonly said to stalk, abduct, or traumatize people, particularly children. The Slender Man is not tied to any particular story, but appears in many disparate works of fiction, mostly composed online.
 The Smith sisters is an urban legend about two young girls who were murdered anonymously while they slept in their bedroom.
 The Snarly Yow is a folklore legend that describes a mysterious giant black dog, who has been sighted at various spots on West Virginia, Maryland and Virginia.
 El Sombrerón (also known as the Goblin and sometimes Tzipitio and Tzizimite) is a folklore legend that describes a legendary character and one of the most infamous legends of Central America.
 The Somerset Gimp is an unknown person or group of people who have been terrorizing the English villages of Yatton, Claverham and Cleeve by running up to unsuspecting people and writhing and grunting while dressed in a masked bodysuit though there have been no reports of them harming anyone. The Somerset Gimp has been around since at least 2018.
 The Spider Bite (or The Red Spot) is a modern urban legend that emerged in Europe during the 1970s. It features a young woman who is bitten on the cheek by a spider. The bite swells into a large boil and soon bursts open to reveal hundreds of tiny spiders escaping from her cheek.
 The Spiteful Mermaid of Pyramid Lake is a man from the Paiute tribe claimed that he fell in love with a mermaid in the lake who cursed the lake in her vengeance.
 Spook Hill is an urban legend that describes a gravity hill, an optical illusion in Lake Wales, Florida, where cars appear to roll up the spooky hill.
 Spring-heeled Jack is a folklore legend of the Victorian era. The first claimed sighting of Spring-heeled Jack was in 1837. Later sightings were reported all over the United Kingdom and were especially prevalent in suburban London, the Midlands and Scotland.
 Stingy Jack is a folklore legend that describes a mythical character sometimes associated with All Hallows Eve while also acting as the mascot of the holiday.

T 
 Teke Teke (テケテケ) is the ghost of a young woman or schoolgirl who was tied to the railway line by bullies, which resulted in her body being cut in half by a train. She is an onryō, or a vengeful spirit, who lurks around urban areas and train stations at night. Since she no longer has lower extremities, she travels on either her hands or elbows, dragging her upper torso and making a scratching or "teke teke"-like sound. If she encounters a potential victim, she will chase them and slice them in half at the torso with a scythe or other weapon.
 Teufelstritt (also known as the black kick, the devil's kick or the Devil's Footstep) is an imprint on the floor of the entrance hall of the Frauenkirche.
 Tha Tian legendarily two temple guardian giants, Giant of Wat Jaeng (Temple of Dawn) and Giant of Wat Pho, Giant of Wat Pho borrows money from Giant of Wat Jaeng and refuses to pay it back. They fought fiercely in the midstream of the Chao Phraya River near Phra Nakhon side. As a result of the battle, the around area was completely flattened, hence the name "Tha Tian", which means "flat pier".
 El Trauco is a folklore legend that describes a repulsive dwarf-like creature with hypnotic powers that is known to prey on and impregnate unmarried women.

U 

 The Ultimate Warrior was an American professional wrestler whose death was the subject of numerous urban legends. Stories existed that he either tied his arm tassels too tightly and cut off the circulation to his body, overdosed on steroids or was killed in the ring while wrestling. Warrior eventually died in 2014 from a heart attack.

 The Utah monolith was a metal monolith found in San Juan County, Utah. It was found by a group of USU biologists in November 2020. It subsequently became the subject of internet attention, especially when there were similar monoliths found worldwide. Some were led to believe that the monoliths placed around the world were connected to extraterrestrials. Unsurprisingly, people came up with various theories around the monoliths. List of works similar to the 2020 Utah monolith

V 
 The Vanishing hitchhiker (or variations such as the ghostly hitchhiker, the disappearing hitchhiker, the phantom hitchhiker or simply the hitchhiker) story is an urban legend in which people traveling by vehicle meet with, or are accompanied by, a hitchhiker who subsequently vanishes without explanation, often from a moving vehicle. Vanishing hitchhikers have been reported for centuries and the story is found across the world with many variants. The popularity and endurance of the legend has helped it spread into popular culture.
 The Vanishing Hotel Room a.k.a. Vanishing Lady: During an international exposition in Paris, a daughter leaves her mother in a hotel room; when she comes back her mother is gone and the hotel staff claims to have no knowledge of the missing woman. It is later revealed that the mother was dying of plague and, fearing for the negative impact on the hotel's public image, the staff just disposed of the mother, redecorated the room and pretended as nothing had happened. This served as inspiration for the movie So Long at the Fair,. and was based on a turn-of-the-century Philadelphia newspaper story.

W 
 Walking Sam (or Tall Man) is an urban legend that describes a 7-foot-tall specter whose job it is to collect the souls of suicide victims and stalks lonely, depressed adolescents.
 Walt Disney’s Cryo Chamber is an urban legend claiming that after his death, Walt’s body (or in some versions just his head) was placed in a cryostasis chamber located somewhere beneath Disney World or Epcot.
 The Water Babies of Massacre Rocks (originates from Idaho) are a Native American legend that are found in a couple of different places in America, but most famously in Pocatello at the Massacre Rocks State Park. They are said to be mischievous or malevolent baby- or dwarf-like creatures, with some tales placing their origins as drowned Native American babies during a famine.
 The Well to Hell legend holds that a team of Russian engineers, purportedly led by an individual named "Mr. Azakov" in an unnamed place in Siberia, had drilled a hole that was 14.4 kilometres (8.9 mi) deep before breaking through to a cavity. Intrigued by this unexpected discovery, they lowered an extremely heat-tolerant microphone, along with other sensory equipment, into the well. The temperature deep within was 1,000 °C (1,832 °F)heat from a chamber of fire from which (purportedly) the tormented screams of the damned could be heard.
The Duke of Wellington at Pau, France first appeared in a 1907 publication coinciding with the 65th anniversary of the founding of the Pau Hunt, and quickly developed into a tale about the origins of Fox hunting in Béarn. After the Peninsular War, Wellington spent just one night at Pau, May 18, 1814, stopping on the route from Toulouse to Madrid. The tale of a more lengthy and marked presence developed 90 years later as a prank that regular winter colonists played on newcomers. The tale found its way into touristic marketing publications, memoires and academic publications during challenging times, and then, despite contradictory historical evidence, it has developed into Bearnese folklore. Worldwide, is difficult to find any 21st century historical passage about the 19th century "English" colony at Pau that does not cite some form of this legend as fact.
 The wendigo is a Native American folklore legend that describes a mythological creature or evil spirit which originates from the Algonquin culture based in and around the East Coast forests of Canada, the Great Plains region of the United States, and the Great Lakes region of the United States and Canada, grouped in modern ethnology as speakers of Algonquian-family languages.
 White Things (or sometimes White Devils or Devil Dogs) is a fictional "bear ape" seems not far removed from descriptions of the White Thing of Kanawha River region of West Virginia.
 Women in Black of Wat Samian Nari the story of the ghost of two sisters in black dresses. The sisters are believed to have been crushed by a train until their bodies were torn in two in front of Wat Samian Nari temple, Chatuchak, Bangkok in the 1990s, Their spirits haunt people at night, especially taxi drivers. Most often it is said that a taxi pick up two sisters in black from entertainment district, Ratchadapisek Road or RCA in the middle of the night (past midnight). The beautiful Thipsuksri sisters (names Chulee Thipsuksri, and Sulee Thipsuksri) ask the driver to bring them to the Wat Samian Nari temple. He thought they would go home after the hangout, but he noticed that they sat quietly, not speaking to each other or even reciprocating with him. As the taxi approaches the destination, they mysteriously vanished from the back seat. Cab driver stepped out of the car in a daze, suddenly he saw the two sisters lying on rail tracks in front of the temple, cut in half, and dragging their bloodied torsos in pain.

Z 
 The Zombie Road (now called the Rock Hollow Trail) is an urban legend and abandoned gravel road located in the Al Foster Memorial Trailhead, Missouri.

See also
 List of alleged extraterrestrial beings
 List of common misconceptions
 List of conspiracy theories
 List of cryptids
 List of reported UFO sightings
 List of urban legends about illegal drugs
 Urban legends about drugs

References

 
Urban legends